I. N. Murthy was an Indian film director, known for his spy thrillers, featuring actor Jaishankar in the 1970s.

Film career
He came to Chennai in early 1950s and worked with directors like Soundararajan Ayyangar, V. Nagayya and T. R. Ramanna. He collaborated with N. T. Rama Rao as executive director for ‘Seetarama Kalyanam’, an award-winning feature. He introduced stars such as Srividya, Murali Mohan and Giri Babu.

Partial filmography

Death
He died on 23 June 2014. He was survived by three sons.

References 

Tamil film directors
2014 deaths
Telugu film directors
20th-century Indian film directors
1925 births
Film directors from Chennai